Uhilamoafa was a king of Uvea who ruled before 1825. He was appointed following the assassination of Muliakaaka, but died of natural causes soon afterwards. He was succeeded by Toifale.

References

Wallis and Futuna monarchs